A stamnos (plural stamnoi; adjective stamnoid) is a type of Greek pottery used to store liquids.  Stamnoi had a foot, wide mouths, lids and handles on their shoulders.  The earliest known examples come from archaic Laconia and Etruria, and they began to be manufactured in Athens around 530 BC.

References

Works cited

External links

Ancient Greek pot shapes